Enoch Godongwana (born 9 June 1957) is a South African politician who has been serving as the Minister of Finance of South Africa in the government of President Cyril Ramaphosa since August 2021. He is also the former head of the African National Congress's economic transformation subcommittee in the national executive committee (NEC).

Early life and education 
Godongwana was born in Cala, Eastern Cape and matriculated from St John’s College in Mthatha. He obtained an MSc degree in financial economics from the University of London in 1998.

Career in the private sector 
Godongwana is a director of Mondi, a paper and packing company, as well as platinum miner Platinum Group Metals.

Canyon Springs Investments 12 
Godongwana chaired Canyon Springs Investments 12, a shell company which he jointly owned 50% of with his wife. Canyon Springs was found to be involved in allegedly defrauding clothing factory workers of R100-million of their pension fund money from 2007 until 2011. His R1.5 million salary was found to be drawn from money loaned by the Southern African Clothing and Textile Workers’ Union (Sactwu) to the company, which loaned money was never returned to the union. He claimed to be unaware of the company's money sources.

Richard Kawie and Sam Buthelezi, other co-owners of Canyons Springs Investment 12, had fraud cases opened against them for not repaying the union's loan.

Political career
Godongwana was a shop steward for the Metal and Allied Workers Union MAWU from 1979. He became general secretary of the National Union of Metalworkers of South Africa (NUMSA) from 1993 to 1996, and served on COSATU's Executive and Central Committees from 1992 to 1997.

He served as deputy minister of public enterprises and deputy minister of economic development in the government of President Jacob Zuma from 2009 until 2012. He resigned after the Canyon Springs Investments matter was revealed by news organisations.

In November 2020, the United Democratic Movement accused Godongwana of using his position in the DBSA to engage in corruption through companies that Godongwana had a stake in.

Other activities
 Joint World Bank-IMF Development Committee, Member (since 2022)
 African Development Bank (AfDB), Ex-Officio Member of the Board of Governors (since 2021)
 World Bank, Ex-Officio Member of the Board of Governors (since 2021)
 Multilateral Investment Guarantee Agency (MIGA), World Bank Group, Ex-Officio Member of the Board of Governors (since 2021)

References

Living people
African National Congress politicians
Finance ministers of South Africa
21st-century South African politicians
1957 births